Shahasradhara Waterfall Located in Sitakunda Upazila of Chittagong District of Bangladesh.

Descriptions
Shahasradhara Waterfall is located in the evergreen forest of Chandranath Reserve Forest block of Sitakund upazila of Chittagong. The eco-park is 35 km from Chittagong city. Located on the east side of Dhaka-Chittagong highway and railway in the north. During the year other than the monsoon, this fountain is less water. The fountain is found five kilometers away from the main gate of ecopark, with a brick path. There is also another spring called Suptadhara Waterfall near the fountain.

See also 
List of waterfalls in Bangladesh

References

External links 

Waterfalls of Bangladesh